Filipe Duarte Cardoso Sousa (born 15 May 1984) is a Portuguese former professional cyclist, who rode professionally between 2006 and 2019.

Major results

2004
 2nd Time trial, National Under-23 Road Championships
2005
 1st  Time trial, National Under-23 Road Championships
2006
 3rd Road race, National Under-23 Road Championships
2007
 1st Stage 7 Vuelta Chihuahua Internacional
2008
 8th Overall Vuelta Ciclista a la Rioja
2009
 1st Stage 2 Volta ao Alentejo
 1st Stage 1 GP Liberty Seguros
 2nd Overall La Tropicale Amissa Bongo
2011
 1st Overall Grande Prémio Crédito Agrícola de Costa Azul
1st Stage 3
 2nd Overall Volta ao Alentejo
1st Stage 4
 2nd GP Liberty Seguros
 3rd Road race, National Road Championships
2012
 2nd Overall Volta ao Alentejo
1st Stage 4
2015
 1st Stage 4 Volta a Portugal

References

External links

1984 births
Living people
Portuguese male cyclists
European Games competitors for Portugal
Cyclists at the 2015 European Games